Moesha is an American situation comedy, originally broadcast between 1996 and 2001. It has won and been nominated for a variety of different awards, including 19 Image Award nominations across the six seasons of the show.

During its time on air, Moesha was nominated for 32 different awards, and won 3 awards. In this list, "year" refers to the year the award was presented to the winner.

By award

Image Awards

Kids' Choice Awards

SHINE Awards

Teen Choice Awards

Young Artist Awards

YoungStar Awards

References

External links
 List of awards at IMDb.com

Lists of awards by television series